"Motherland" is the national anthem of Mauritius. The music was composed by Philippe Gentil, and the English lyrics were written by Jean-Georges Prosper. The anthem is short and briefly describes the luscious landscape of Mauritius. It also mentions the qualities of its people: peace, justice and liberty.

The national anthem was first played during the first Independence Day on 12 March 1968.

History
Mauritius was a British colony from 1810 and became an independent state on 12 March 1968, with Elizabeth II as Queen of Mauritius, represented as head of state by the Governor-General. The last governor, Sir John Shaw Rennie, served as the first governor-general until 27 August 1968. A competition was held to choose the best national anthem. Jean Georges Prosper, a popular poet, won the competition, and "Motherland" was chosen as the national anthem. Music for the anthem was later composed by police band musician Philippe Gentil. During the announcement of independence, the flag of the United Kingdom was lowered by Lieutenant D.E. Wenn from the British side, and the flag of Mauritius was hoisted by Inspector Palmyre of the Special Mobile Force (SMF) from the Mauritian side. "God Save the Queen", the national anthem of the UK, was played for the last time, and "Motherland" was played for the first time. It was followed by firing of 31 salvos in the harbour and a loud cheer from the crowd.

The Labour Party ruled Mauritius from the time of independence in 1968 to 1982. The opposing Mauritian Militant Movement won the 1982 election. The party decided to establish Mauritian Creole as the national language and wanted to sing the national anthem in Creole during the 15th Independence Day on 15 March 1983. The move was sternly opposed by the alliance partners; the party lost power in 1983.

Lyrics

Criticism
Critics consider that the national anthem failed to inspire the people during not-so-prosperous times of the economy when communalism and casteism made headway. There is a strong criticism in sections of Mauritian media that although the anthem states unity as the prime strength of the nation, the nation stands divided even after 40 years of independence. Unity described as the strength of the nation, as quoted as "as one people as one nation", is also posted as a challenge the country faces at the face of globalization. The harmony and cultural mix of different religious communities of the country are also not seen united in the nation. The unrest during 1969 clashes between Muslims and Creoles and the football tournaments until 1980 conducted on community basis are commonly quoted to show the indifference.

See also 
 Coat of arms of Mauritius
 List of national anthems

References

External links
Motherland MIDI

Mauritian music
African anthems
National symbols of Mauritius
National anthem compositions in C major